Jacques Joseph O'Mahoney (February 7, 1919 – December 14, 1989), known professionally as Jock Mahoney, was an American actor and stuntman. He starred in two Action/Adventure television series, The Range Rider and Yancy Derringer. He played Tarzan in two feature films and was associated in various capacities with several other Tarzan productions. He was credited variously as Jacques O'Mahoney, Jock O'Mahoney, Jack Mahoney, and finally Jock Mahoney.

Early life, education, and military service
Mahoney was born in Chicago, Illinois and reared in Davenport, Iowa. He was of French and Irish descent, the only child of Ruth and Charles O'Mahoney. He entered the University of Iowa in Iowa City and excelled at swimming and diving, but dropped out to enlist in the United States Marine Corps when World War II began. He served as a pilot, flight instructor, and war correspondent.

Career
After his discharge from the Marine Corps, Mahoney moved to Los Angeles,  and for a time was a horse breeder. However, he soon became a movie stuntman, doubling for Gregory Peck, Errol Flynn, and John Wayne. Director Vincent Sherman recalled staging the climactic fight scene in his 1948 film Adventures of Don Juan and could find only one stuntman who was willing to leap from a high staircase in the scene. That man was Mahoney, who demanded and received $1,000 for the dangerous stunt. 

Most of Mahoney's films of the late 1940s and early 1950s were produced by Columbia Pictures. Like many Columbia contract players, Mahoney worked in the studio's two-reel comedies. Beginning in 1947, writer-director Edward Bernds cast Mahoney in slapstick comedies starring the Three Stooges. Mahoney had large speaking roles in these films, and often played his scenes for laughs. Often cast alongside heroine Christine McIntyre, Mahoney appeared in the Stooge films Out West (1947), Squareheads of the Round Table (1948) (and its 1954 remake, Knutzy Knights), Fuelin' Around (1949), and Punchy Cowpunchers (1950). In the Stooge films, Mahoney—striking a heroic pose—would suddenly get clumsy, tripping over something or taking sprawling pratfalls.

Beginning in 1950, Columbia management noticed Mahoney's acting skills and gave him starring roles in two adventure serials, Cody of the Pony Express (1950) and Roar of the Iron Horse (1951). Mahoney succeeded stuntman Ted Mapes as the double for Charles Starrett in Columbia's  The Durango Kid Western series. The Durango Kid wore a mask covering much of his face, enabling Mahoney to replace Starrett in the action scenes. Mahoney's daring stunts made it seem that the older Starrett grew, the more athletic he became. Mahoney contributed so much to this series that he was awarded featured billing and major supporting roles as well, first as villains and then as sympathetic characters. By 1952 Columbia was billing him as Jack Mahoney.

When Charles Starrett's contract ran out in the spring of 1952, Columbia decided to replace him with Mahoney, opposite Starrett's sidekick Smiley Burnette. The first film was completed but never released; Columbia abandoned the series in June 1952, bringing an end to its long history of B-Western production.

Cowboy star Gene Autry, then working at Columbia, hired Mahoney to star in a television series. Autry's Flying A Productions filmed 79 half-hour episodes of the syndicated The Range Rider from 1951 to 1953. In 1959, a lost episode was shown six years after the series ended. He was billed as Jack Mahoney. The character had no name other than Range Rider. His series co-star was Dick Jones, playing the role of Dick West.

In the 1958 Western film Money, Women and Guns, Mahoney played the starring role. The film also starred Kim Hunter.
 
For the 1958 television season, he starred in the outdoor-adventure seriesYancy Derringer for 34 episodes, which aired on CBS. Yancy Derringer was a gentleman adventurer living in New Orleans, Louisiana, after the American Civil War. He had a Pawnee Indian companion named Pahoo Katchewa  ("Wolf Who Stands in Water"), who did not speak, played by X Brands. Pahoo had saved the life of Derringer, and thereafter was responsible for Derringer's life.

Jock O'Mahoney starred in 64 feature films.

Tarzan films and television series
In 1948, Mahoney auditioned to play Tarzan after the departure of Johnny Weissmuller, but the role went to Lex Barker.

In 1960, he appeared as Coy Banton, a villain, in Tarzan the Magnificent, starring Gordon Scott.  Mahoney's strong presence, work ethic, and lean (6 foot, 4 inch, 220 pounds) frame impressed producer Sy Weintraub, who wanted a "new look" for the fabled apeman.

In 1962, Mahoney became the 13th actor to portray Tarzan when he appeared in Tarzan Goes to India, shot on location in India. A year later, he again played the role in Tarzan's Three Challenges, shot in Thailand. When this film was released, Mahoney, at 44, became the oldest actor to play the jungle king, surpassing Weissmuller and P. Dempsey Tabler, a record that still stands. Dysentery and dengue fever plagued Mahoney during the shoot in the Thai jungles, and his weight plummeted to 175 pounds. He needed a year and a half to regain his health. Owing to his health problems and the fact that producer Weintraub had decided to go for a "younger look" for the apeman, his contract was mutually dissolved.

Mahoney made three appearances on the Ron Ely Tarzan series--The Ultimate Weapon (1966), The Deadly Silence (1966) (a two-part episode, later edited into a feature film), and Mask of Rona (1967).

In 1981, Mahoney returned to the Tarzan film series as the stunt coordinator on the John Derek-directed remake of Tarzan, the Ape Man. He was billed as "Jack O'Mahoney".

Television guest roles
Mahoney was cast as an engineer, Andy Prentis, in the 1954 episode, "Husband Pro-Tem," on the syndicated anthology series, Death Valley Days, hosted by Stanley Andrews.  In the story line, Prentis is hired by a railroad executive, Alonzo Phelps (Howard Negley) (1898–1983) to negotiate a private agreement with the Indian Chief Black Hawk (Lane Bradford) so that a railroad can be constructed across Indian lands. In his assignment, Prentis soon romantically tangles with Phelps' daughter, Evelyn (Gloria Marshall). In February 1953, Mahoney co-starred with his wife Margaret Field in the Death Valley Days episode "Swamper Ike".

In 1960, Mahoney guest-starred in the Rawhide episode "Incident of the Sharpshooter". He also appeared in television guest-starring roles on such series as Batman, the Ron Ely Tarzan series, Hawaii Five-O, Laramie, and The Streets of San Francisco. In 1973, he suffered a stroke at age 54 while filming an episode of Kung Fu, but he recovered.

Later career and death
In the 1980s, Mahoney made guest appearances on the television series B. J. and the Bear and The Fall Guy. During the final years of his life, he was a popular guest at film conventions and autograph shows.
Mahoney died of a second stroke at age 70 on December 14, 1989, two days after being involved in an automobile accident in Bremerton, Washington. His ashes were scattered into the Pacific Ocean.

A tribute to Mahoney entitled "Coming Home" was published on the website of marksman Joe Bowman of Houston, a close Mahoney friend. On February 6, 1990, the poem was read at a memorial tribute to Mahoney held at the Sportsmen's Lodge in Studio City, California. More than 350 attended, including Bowman. The reading was conducted by Mahoney's widow, Autumn O'Mahoney.

Personal life
Mahoney was married three times, with three children and five stepchildren. His first wife was Lorraine O'Donnell, with whom he had two children, Kathleen O'Mahoney and Jim O'Mahoney, before their divorce. He next married actress Margaret Field in 1952. Their daughter, Princess O'Mahoney, was born six months later. Margaret Field already had two young children, Richard D. Field and Sally Field, from her first marriage. Mahoney and Field divorced in June 1968. In her 2018 memoir, In Pieces, Sally Field wrote that Mahoney subjected her to sexual abuse throughout her childhood. 

Mahoney's daughter, Princess O'Mahoney, later became a television and film assistant director.

Partial filmography

 Son of the Guardsman (1946, Serial) – Captain Kenley (uncredited)
 The Fighting Frontiersman (1946) – Henchman Waco (uncredited)
 South of the Chisholm Trail (1947) – Henchman (uncredited)
 Over the Santa Fe Trail (1947) – Sheriff (uncredited)
 Swing the Western Way (1947) – Chief Iron Stomach (uncredited)
 The Stranger from Ponca City (1947) – Henchman Tensleep (uncredited)
 The Swordsman (1948) – Clansman Messenger (uncredited)
 Blazing Across the Pecos (1948) – Reports Indian Raid (uncredited)
 Triple Threat (1948) – Football Player (uncredited)
 Smoky Mountain Melody (1948) – Buckeye
 The Doolins of Oklahoma (1949) – Tulsa Jack Blake
 The Blazing Trail (1949) – Full-House Patterson
 Rim of the Canyon (1949) – Pete Reagan
 Jolson Sings Again (1949) – (uncredited)
 Bandits of El Dorado (1949) – Tim Starling (uncredited)
 Horsemen of the Sierras (1949) – Bill Grant
 Renegades of the Sage (1949) – Lt. Hunter
 The Nevadan (1950) – Sandy
 Cody of the Pony Express (1950, serial) – Lt. Jim Archer
 Cow Town (1950) – Tod Jeffreys
 Texas Dynamo (1950) – Bill Beck
 Hoedown (1950) – Stoney Rhodes
 David Harding, Counterspy (1950) – Brown (uncredited)
 The Kangaroo Kid (1950) – Tex Kinnane
 Frontier Outpost (1950) – Lt. Peck (uncredited)
 Lightning Guns (1950) – Sheriff Rob Saunders
 Santa Fe (1951) – Crake
 Roar of the Iron Horse – Rail-Blazer of the Apache Trail (1951, serial) – Jim Grant
 The Texas Rangers (1951) – Duke Fisher
 The Lady and the Bandit (1951) – Tavern Troublemaker (uncredited)
 Pecos River (1951) – Himself
 Smoky Canyon (1952) – Himself
 The Hawk of Wild River (1952) – Himself
 Laramie Mountains (1952) – Swift Eagle
 The Rough, Tough West (1952) – Himself
 Junction City (1952) – Himself
 The Kid from Broken Gun (1952) – Himself
 Overland Pacific (1954) – Ross Granger
 Gunfighters of the Northwest (1954, serial) – Sgt. Joe Ward
 A Day of Fury (1956) – Marshal Allan Burnett
 I've Lived Before (1956) – John Bolan / Lt. Peter Stevens
 Away All Boats (1956) – Alvick
 Showdown at Abilene (1956) – Jim Trask
 Battle Hymn (1957) – Maj. Frank Moore
 The Land Unknown (1957) – Commander Harold Roberts
 Joe Dakota (1957) – Joe Dakota
 Slim Carter (1957) – Slim Carter aka Hugh Mack
 A Time to Love and a Time to Die (1958) – Immerman
 The Last of the Fast Guns (1958) – Brad Ellison
 Money, Women and Guns (1958) – 'Silver' Ward Hogan
 Tarzan the Magnificent (1960) – Coy Banton
 Three Blondes in His Life (1961) – Duke Wallace
 Tarzan Goes to India (1962) – Tarzan
 Tarzan's Three Challenges (1963) – Tarzan
 California (1963) – Don Michael O'Casey
 The Marines Who Never Returned (1963) – Nick Rawlins
 The Walls of Hell (1964) – Lt. Jim Sorenson
 Cimarron (1964)
 Moro Witch Doctor (1964) – CIA Agent Jefferson Stark
 Runaway Girl (1965) – Randy Minola
 Once Before I Die (1966) – Major (uncredited)
 The Glory Stompers (1967) – Smiley
 Bandolero! (1968) – Stoner
 The Love Bug (1968) – Driver #21
 Portrait of Violence (1968)
 Tom (1973) – Sgt. Berry
 Their Only Chance (1975) – Grizzly Bill, Marvin Latham
 The End (1978) – Old Man

Selected Television

See also
 List of people from Chicago
 List of people from Davenport, Iowa
 List of people from Los Angeles
 List of University of Iowa alumni

References

Sources
 Essoe, Gabe (1968). Tarzan of The Movies A Pictorial History of More Than Fifty Years of Edgar Rice Burroughs' Legendary Hero.  New York City:  Citadel Press.  .
 Field, Sally (2018). In Pieces. New York City: Grand Central Publishing. .

External links
 
 Jock Mahoney's cement boot-prints at Apacheland 1967

1919 births
1989 deaths
20th-century American male actors
American male film actors
American male television actors
American stunt performers
American people of French descent
American people of Irish descent
Columbia Pictures people
Male actors from Chicago
Male actors from Iowa
Male actors from Los Angeles
Neurological disease deaths in Washington (state)
Actors from Davenport, Iowa
Tarzan
United States Marine Corps pilots of World War II
University of Iowa alumni
Western (genre) television actors
California Republicans
20th-century American comedians
Male Western (genre) film actors